Victoria Rumary (born 28 April 1988) is a British Paralympic archer. She won bronze in the Women's individual W1 at the 2020 Summer Paralympics in Tokyo.

References

External links
 
 

1988 births
Living people
British female archers
Paralympic archers of Great Britain
Paralympic bronze medalists for Great Britain
Paralympic medalists in archery
Archers at the 2020 Summer Paralympics
Medalists at the 2020 Summer Paralympics
21st-century British women